Abraxas intermedia is a species of moth belonging to the family Geometridae. It was described by Warren in 1888. It is known from Subathu in India.

References

Abraxini
Moths of Asia
Moths described in 1888